Rasha Rizk (born 5 March 1976) is a Syrian singer-songwriter. She is known for her work with the Syrian cartoon dubbing company, Venus Centre, and for singing the Arabic theme songs for popular cartoons/anime such as: Remi, Nobody's Girl, Detective Conan and the Digimon Series.

In October 2017, Rizk announced on Instagram and Facebook that she had received a primary Grammy nomination in two different categories, Best New Artist and Best World Music Album for her album Malak.

Early life 
Rizk started her formal vocal training at the age of 9, and by the age of 12, she won a children's talent competition. She studied French literature at Sorbonne University in Paris. Further, she graduated from the Higher Institute of Music in Damascus and taught opera singing  there.

Career 
On 12 October 2003, Rizk participated in the first opera in Arabic, Ibn Sina by the Dutch composer Michiel Borstlap, in Doha, Qatar. In 2000, she and the composer Ibrahim Sulaimani started the Syrian Jazz Band Itar Shame3 (Arabic: إطار شمع).

In 2008, she worked with French new-age band Era on their songs Prayers and Reborn.

Personal life 
In 2003, Rizk married composer Ibrahim Sulaimani. Together they have a daughter, Sarah.

She supported the Syrian Revolution in 2011 and lives now with her family in France. Repeatedly, she expressed her intention to go back to Syria, when the conditions became appropriate, which she considered a duty toward her students.

Songs

Anime/Cartoon theme songs 
Rasha Rizk is widely famous in the Middle East for co-writing and singing the theme songs of many of the cartoon and anime films shown on Spacetoon TV channel; the most famous children TV channel in the Arabic speaking countries.

This is a list of some theme songs she sang:

References 

1976 births
Living people
Syrian musicians
English-language singers
Arabic-language singers
21st-century Syrian women singers
Singers who perform in Classical Arabic